My Horizontal Life: A Collection of One-Night Stands is a best-selling book by Chelsea Handler that was published in 2005.  The book is a collection of stories about the author's various one-night stands. The book was a success that helped her to launch her writing career and led to her second book Are You There, Vodka? It's Me, Chelsea.

Reception
As of mid-2008, with the release of her second book Are You There Vodka? It's Me, Chelsea, sales of her first book have since rocketed; the two titles have sold a combined total of 1.7 million copies, according to Nielsen BookScan and have both topped several bestseller lists.

References

Essay collections
2005 non-fiction books
Books by Chelsea Handler